Ilisoa is a genus of African araneomorph spiders in the family Cyatholipidae, and was first described by C. E. Griswold in 1987.  it contains only three species, all found in South Africa: I. conjugalis, I. hawequas, and I. knysna.

References

Endemic fauna of South Africa
Araneomorphae genera
Cyatholipidae
Spiders of South Africa